Akja Täjiýewna Nurberdiýewa (born 1957) is a Turkmen politician who has served as the Chairperson of the Assembly of Turkmenistan from 2006 to 2018. She replaced Öwezgeldi Ataýew who was arrested the previous day.

References

External links 
 

1957 births
Democratic Party of Turkmenistan politicians
Living people
People from Ashgabat
Chairmen of the Assembly of Turkmenistan
21st-century Turkmenistan women politicians
21st-century Turkmenistan politicians
20th-century Turkmenistan women